Richard Ray Perez is an American documentary film producer and director. His productions include Unprecedented: The 2000 Presidential Election, a political documentary. Perez is the co-executive producer of the second season of The Freedom Files, which examines the impact civil liberties violations can have on people's daily lives.

In 2006, Perez was the supervising producer and the series director of Sierra Club Chronicles, a documentary series of environmental stories.

Other works of his includes Uncovered: The War on Iraq, Outfoxed: Rupert Murdoch's War on Journalism and Crashing the Party: The Democratic National Convention.

He is currently the co-executive producer of the online documentary series, In Their Boots.

Richard Ray Perez is a cum laude graduate of Harvard University in Visual & Environmental Studies.  He is a native of San Fernando, California.

External links 
 Richard Ray Perez — Official site

Harvard University alumni
Living people
Year of birth missing (living people)
American documentary film producers
American documentary film directors